The 2019 Rafa Nadal Open Banc Sabadell was a professional tennis tournament played on hard courts. It was the second edition of the tournament which was part of the 2019 ATP Challenger Tour. It took place in Manacor, Spain between 26 August and 1 September 2019.

Singles main-draw entrants

Seeds

 1 Rankings are as of 19 August 2019.

Other entrants
The following players received wildcards into the singles main draw:
  Carlos Alcaraz
  Aaron Cohen
  Carlos Gimeno Valero
  Andy Murray
  Perdo Vives Marcos

The following players received entry into the singles main draw as alternates:
  Íñigo Cervantes
  Gerard Granollers
  Harri Heliövaara
  Illya Marchenko
  Luis David Martínez
  Felipe Meligeni Alves
  Imran Sibille
  Tim van Rijthoven

Champions

Singles

  Emil Ruusuvuori def.  Matteo Viola 6–0, 6–1.

Doubles

  Sander Arends /  David Pel def.  Karol Drzewiecki /  Szymon Walków 7–5, 6–4.

References

2019 ATP Challenger Tour
2019 in Spanish sport
August 2019 sports events in Spain
September 2019 sports events in Spain